Les Autels is a commune in the department of Aisne in the Hauts-de-France region of northern France.

Geography
Les Autels is located some 35 km west of Charleville-Mézières and 10 km south of Aubenton. The northern and eastern borders of the commune are the departmental border between Aisne and Ardennes. Access to the commune is by the D1100 road from Brunehamel in the west which passes through the village and continues south to join the D530 south of the village. The D530 goes north in the commune changing to the D10B at the border and continues north to Blanchefosse-et-Bay. Apart from the village there is also the hamlet of Haut-Chemin south of the village. The commune is mostly farmland with some scattered forests.

The Ruisseau du Moulin Bataille flows through the north of the commune towards the southwest forming part of the western border before continuing south to join the Serre near Mainbresson. An unnamed stream rises near the village and flows southwest to join the Ruisseau du Moulin Bataille.

Neighbouring communes and villages

Administration

List of Successive Mayors

Demography
In 2017 the commune had 57 inhabitants.

Sites and monuments
The Church of Saint-Nicolas
The War Memorial
The Lavoir (Public laundry)

See also
Communes of the Aisne department

External links
Les Autels on the old IGN website 
Les Autels on Géoportail, National Geographic Institute (IGN) website 
Les Autels on the 1750 Cassini Map

References

Communes of Aisne